The 2019–20 BBL season was the 33rd campaign of the British Basketball League,  the top British professional basketball league, since its in 1987. The season featured 12 teams from across England and Scotland. On 17 March 2020, the season was postponed due to the COVID-19 pandemic in the United Kingdom. On 1 June 2020, the season was cancelled, with no League or Playoffs champions declared.

Changes to format
The 2019–20 season saw a significantly revamped format for the first time in a number of years.

The newly-formatted BBL Cup began the 2019–20 season in September, with group stages (2 geographical groups, North and South, of 6 teams each) to determine 8 teams to progress to the Quarter-finals. Single-legged quarter finals and two-legged semi finals matches would determine the two finalists to contest the Cup final.

The Championship would run from December to April. All 12 teams were to play each other twice, once home once away, for a 22-game regular season (as opposed to previous years where teams would play each other 3 times for a 33-game regular season). The top 8 teams would qualify for the end of season Playoffs.

The Playoffs were due to run from April to May and for the first time in 21 years were due to be determined over a best-of-three series. The Playoffs Final would once again be held at the O2 Arena, London.

Teams

Arenas and locations

Personnel and sponsorship

Coaching changes

BBL Cup

The newly-formatted BBL Cup began the 2019–20 season on Friday 20 September, with the group stages running until Sunday 24 November. The 12 teams were split into 2 geographical groups, North and South. Each team played each other twice (once home, once away) with the top 4 teams in each group progressing to the Quarter-finals. Single-legged quarter finals and two-legged semi finals matches determined the two finalists to contest the Cup final on Sunday 26 January at the Arena Birmingham.

Qualification Stage

North Group

South Group

Quarter-finals

Semi-finals

Final

BBL Championship
The BBL Championship ran from Friday 6 December – Tuesday 17 March. All 12 teams were scheduled to play each other twice, once home once away, for a 22-game regular season. On 24 January 2020, London City Royals withdrew from the league, and their 1–3 record was expunged.

On 17 March 2020, the season was postponed due to the COVID-19 pandemic in the United Kingdom. On 1 June 2020, the season was cancelled, with no League or Playoffs champions declared.

Standings

Results

Playoffs
The BBL Playoffs were due to run from Friday 24 April – Sunday 17 May, with the final to be held at the O2 Arena, London. The top 8 teams from the regular season of the BBL Championship would have contested the Playoffs, which for the first time in 21 years were to be determined over a best-of-three series.

BBL Trophy

The BBL Trophy retained the same format as introduced in the 2018–19 season. The twelve BBL teams were joined in the first round draw by four invited teams; Solent Kestrels and Worthing Thunder from the English Basketball League, Dunfermline Reign from the Scottish Basketball Championship and Basketball Wales. There was an open draw to form a bracket, mapping out each team's path to the final which was held, for the 8th consecutive year, at the Emirates Arena in Glasgow.

First round

Quarter-finals

Semi-finals

Final

British clubs in European competitions

No British clubs participated in European competition for the 2019–20 season. Leicester and London both declined their invitations from FIBA.

Notes

References

External links

British Basketball League seasons
1
British
British Basketball League